Lettermore is a Gaeltacht village in County Galway, Ireland. It is also the name of an island, linked by road to the mainland, on which the village sits. The name comes from the Irish Leitir Móir meaning great rough hillside (leitir = rough hillside). The main spoken language of the area is Irish. Lettermore island is in two halves. The eastern half is known as Lettermore, while the western half is known as Lettercallow (Leitir Calaidh, "rough hillside by a marshy area").

Demographics

See also 
 List of towns in the Republic of Ireland
 Darach O'Cathain
 Gorumna
 CLG Naomh Anna, Leitir Móir
 Fiachra Breathnach
 Seoighe Inish Bearachain
 Peigín Leitir Móir

References

See also
 List of towns in the Republic of Ireland

Towns and villages in County Galway
Gaeltacht places in County Galway
Gaeltacht towns and villages
Articles on towns and villages in Ireland possibly missing Irish place names
Islands of County Galway